Simon Sohm (born 11 April 2001) is a Swiss footballer who plays as a defensive midfielder for Serie B club Parma and the Switzerland national team.

Club career

Early career
Sohm spent his entire youth career with FC Zürich, playing with the U16s and U18s before being promoted to the senior squad.

FC Zürich
On 2 July 2018, Sohm signed a professional contract with the club. He made his league debut for the club on 28 October 2018 in a 3–2 away loss to St. Gallen. He was subbed on for Adrian Winter in the 91st minute.

Parma
On 4 October 2020, he signed a five-year contract with Italian club Parma.

International career
Sohm was included in the Switzerland squad for the 2018 UEFA European Under-17 Championship. He played all three games of the group stage, against England, Italy, and Israel.

He made his national team debut on 7 October 2020 in a friendly against Croatia.

Personal life
Sohm was born in Zürich, Switzerland and is of Nigerian Yoruba descent.

References

External links
 
 Profile at UEFA.com

2001 births
Living people
Footballers from Zürich
Swiss men's footballers
Switzerland youth international footballers
Switzerland international footballers
Swiss people of Nigerian descent
FC Zürich players
Parma Calcio 1913 players
Association football midfielders
Swiss Super League players
Serie A players
Swiss expatriate footballers
Expatriate footballers in Italy
Switzerland under-21 international footballers